Katrin Ebner-Steiner (born 26th August 1978) is a German politician.  She represents the Alternative for Germany ("AfD", or Alternative für Deutschland) party and is former chair of the AfD in the Bavarian state parliament.

Notes

Living people
1978 births
21st-century German women politicians
Alternative for Germany politicians